Metaloricaria nijsseni is a species of armored catfish endemic to Suriname where it occurs in the Suriname, Saramacca, Nickerie and Corantijn River basins.  This species grows to a length of  SL.

Etymology
The catfish is named in honor of Han Nijssen (1935-2013), of the Zoölogisch Museum.

References 

Harttiini
Taxa named by Isaäc J. H. Isbrücker
Fish described in 1975
Fish of Suriname
Endemic fauna of Suriname